The following is a list of the conferences in many Methodist Churches, such as The United Methodist Church and Evangelical Wesleyan Church.

Conferences
There are several kinds of conferences in Methodism:

General Conference is the highest deliberative body for the United Methodist Church, the Allegheny Wesleyan Methodist Church, among others.
Jurisdictional Conferences in the U.S.; and
Central Conferences outside the U.S. elect and assign bishops in their region and comprise
Annual Conferences, the basic organizational unit in the denomination.
District Conference, Annual conferences are further divided into districts, each served by a district superintendent.
Charge Conference, a charge is one or more churches served by a minister under appointment by the bishop.

References

External links 
 Context for Jurisdictions versus Conferences 

United Methodist Church
Church organization
Conferences
United Methodist Annual Conferences